Clayoquot  is an anglicization of the Nuu-chah-nulth language name "Tla-o-qui-aht", one of the indigenous tribes of the region so named.  It may refer to:
Clayoquot, British Columbia, historically also known as Port Cox, a community on Stubbs Island, just northwest of Tofino, British Columbia
Clayoquot Sound and the associated region, including:
the Clayoquot River
Clayoqua 6, an Indian Reserve at the mouth of that river
Clayoquot Arm Provincial Park
Clayoquot Plateau Provincial Park
the Tla-o-qui-aht First Nations, a band government of the Nuu-chah-nulth peoples, incorporating a number of historical tribes including:
the Tla-o-qui-aht people (the two other groups comprising the Tla-o-qui-aht First Nations are the Hesquiaht and the Ahousaht)
, a Canadian minesweeper sunk in World War II